Matthew 2:22 is the twenty-second verse of the second chapter of the Gospel of Matthew in the New Testament. The young Jesus and the Holy Family have just left Egypt after hearing of the death of King Herod.

Content
In the King James Version of the Bible the text reads:
But when he heard that Archelaus 
did reign in Judaea in the room 
of his father Herod, he was afraid 
to go thither: notwithstanding, 
being warned of God in a dream, he 
turned aside into the parts of Galilee:

The World English Bible translates the passage as:
But when he heard that Archelaus 
was reigning over Judea in the 
place of his father, Herod, he 
was afraid to go there. Being 
warned in a dream, he withdrew 
into the region of Galilee

The Novum Testamentum Graece text is:
ἀκούσας δὲ ὅτι Ἀρχέλαος
βασιλεύει τῆς Ἰουδαίας ἀντὶ τοῦ πατρὸς αὐτοῦ
Ἡρῴδου ἐφοβήθη ἐκεῖ ἀπελθεῖν
χρηματισθεὶς δὲ κατ’ ὄναρ ἀνεχώρησεν
εἰς τὰ μέρη τῆς Γαλιλαίας

For a collection of other versions see BibleHub Matthew 2:22

Analysis
Upon Herod's death his kingdom was divided in three. Judea went to his son Archelaus, who was as great a tyrant as his father. Most notably he killed some 3000 rebels soon after ascending the throne. His cruelty aroused such popular anger that in 6 AD Archelaus was deposed by the Romans in response to complaints from his subjects. As a result, the Romans began directly appointing a governor for the area, with Pontius Pilate being a notable example. The concern Joseph expresses in this verse thus fits with what is known from the history of the period. The decision to go to Galilee was also a reasonable one. That region was ruled by Herod's far more even-tempered son Herod Antipas and there is evidence that the region had become a refuge to others fleeing the rule of Archelaus or the Romans.

One incongruity is that the word translated as reign, more precisely means "reign as a king." This is incorrect, unlike his father Archelaus was only an ethnarch, not a king. Most scholars, even evangelical ones, are content to accept this as the author of Matthew simply being imprecise. There have also been several attempts to explain the discrepancy. Jones notes that Augustus' decision that Archelaus would only be granted the title of ethnarch occurred six months into his reign. Jones thus thinks it possible that during these first months Archelaus did call himself king, and it would have been during this period that Joseph returned from Egypt.

Joseph is again given important information in a dream. However, this time the author of Matthew does not report on its origin. The vocabulary of the passage and the previous instances make most scholars accept this to be another message from God.

The Gospel of Luke mentions none of this. Most scholars believe this is because Luke sees Nazareth as Joseph's original home, and thus sees no reason to explain why he returns there. Much time is spent explaining why the family was in Bethlehem at the time of Jesus' birth.  Matthew has the opposite view seeing Bethlehem as the family's original home, as demonstrated by them having a house in Matthew 2:11. It thus needs to go into some detail explaining why they eventually move to Nazareth. The important word is that translated as "withdrew" in the WEB. Gundry notes that the author of Matthew would have used return if Nazareth was Joseph's original home and "withdrawing" implies leaving for a new location. Schweizer sees this as unambiguous proof that Matthew has Joseph originally from Bethlehem. Evangelicals, of course, reject this view. France states that the author of Matthew does not discuss Joseph's origin in Nazareth because of his "typical avoidance of unnecessary detail."

Referring to this passage the Glossa Ordinaria asks and answers: "why was he not afraid to go into Galilee, seeing Archelaus ruled there also? He could be better concealed in Nazareth than in Jerusalem, which was the capital of the kingdom, and where Archelaus was constantly resident."

Commentary from the Church Fathers
Josephus: Herod had nine wives, by seven of whom he had a numerous issue. By Josida, his first born Antipater—by Mariamine, Alexander and Aristobulus—by Mathuca, a Samaritan woman, Archelaus—by Cleopatra of Jerusalem, Herod, who was afterwards tetrarch, and Philip. The three first were put to death by Herod; and after his death, Archelaus seized the throne by occasion of his father's will, and the question of the succession was carried before Augustus Cæsar. After some delay, he made a distribution of the whole of Herod's dominions in accordance with the Senate's advice. To Archelaus he assigned one half, consisting of Idumæa and Judæa, with the title of tetrarch, and a promise of that of king if he showed himself deserving of it. The rest he divided into two tetrarchates, giving Galilee to Herod the tetrarch, Ituræa and Trachonitis to Philip. Thus Archelaus was after his father's death a duarch, which kind of sovereignty is here called a kingdom.

Augustine:  Here it may be asked, How then could his parents go up every year of Christ's childhood to Jerusalem, as Luke relates, if fear of Archelaus now prevented them from approaching it? This difficulty is easily solved. At the festival they might escape notice in the crowd, and by returning soon, where in ordinary times they might be afraid to live. So they neither became irreligious by neglecting the festival, nor notorious by dwelling continually in Jerusalem. Or it is open to us to understand Luke when he says, they went up every year, as speaking of a time when they had nothing to fear from Archelaus, who, as Josephus relates, reigned only nine years. There is yet a difficulty in what follows; Being warned in a dream, he turned aside into the parts of Galilee. If Joseph was afraid to go into Judæa because one of Herod's sons, Archelaus, reigned there, how could he go into Galilee, where another of his sons Herod was tetrarch, as Luke tells us? As if the times of which Luke is speaking were times in which there was any longer need to fear for the Child, when even in Judæa things were so changed, that Archelaus no longer ruled there, but Pilate was governor.

References

Further reading
Albright, W.F. and C.S. Mann. "Matthew." The Anchor Bible Series. New York: Doubleday & Company, 1971.
Brown, Raymond E. The Birth of the Messiah: A Commentary on the Infancy Narratives in Matthew and Luke. London: G. Chapman, 1977.

02:22
Biblical dreams and visions